The Monster and the Girl is a 1941 American black-and-white horror film directed by Stuart Heisler and released by Paramount Pictures.

Plot
The film revolves around a small-town church organist named Scot Webster (Philip Terry) attempting to save his sister, Susan (Ellen Drew) from the clutches of big city gangster W. S. Bruhl (Paul Lukas). When one of Bruhl's gang members is double-crossed in Bruhl's rented room, and killed by a gunman, the man tosses him the gun and disappears. Scot is tried and executed. A scientist (George Zucco) salvages his brain and transplants it into a gorilla. Using the strength of his new, bestial body, Webster begins stalking the gangsters to exact his revenge.

Cast

Production
The Monster and the Girl was developed under the title of Dead On Arrival and was written as D.O.A.. After the release of Michael Curtiz's film The Walking Dead in 1936, a few films combined genre themes of crime films and science-fiction horror. These included The Man They Could Not Hang, Before I Hang, and Black Friday all which starred Boris Karloff and featured individuals who return from being dead to exact revenge. The Monster and the Girl used these themes but applied it to a monster movie theme for The Monster and the Girl. 

The censorship board rejected original story ideas due to the plot dealing with white slavery and homicide. The script was changed to imply Susan's entrapment by Munn. This also changed Susan being forced into prostitution and working as a bar hostess to pay off the debt for her apartment. The film went into production in Late July and finished filming in late August 1940.

Release
The Monster and the Girl was distributed theatrically by Paramount Pictures on February 28, 1941. After its release, the Milwaukee Film Commission withdrew the film from theaters on the grounds that it was a "white slavery" film. The ban also stated that it showcased juries as being under gangster control which would make it impossible for justice to be carried out.

The Monster and the Girl was released on Blu-ray by Scream Factory on June 16, 2020 as the fifth volume in their Universal Horror Collection, along with Captive Wild Woman, Jungle Woman and Jungle Captive. It features an informative audio commentary by Tom Weaver and Steve Kronenberg.

Reception
Blair Davis, author of Recovering 1940s Horror Cinema described the reception of the film as positive. A review in The Chicago Tribune calling it "weird and skeery  no end" but full of "snappy dialog". The review added that Ellen Drew "depicts stark terror so realistically that I feel she is scheduled to slip into the boot of Fay Wray". Variety called the film "a chiller-diller that will send fans of goose-pimply melodrama from the theaters amply satisfied" and "red meat of the bugaboo ticket buyers".

From retrospective reviews, Craig Butler of AllMovie declared the film as "definitely one of the strangest pictures ever made", that was still "fairly effective and entertaining little "B" flick—and not one that gets by just on camp value", noting that the stories plot points were ridiculous, but "has some very interesting points, including a mixture of noir and horror which, while not totally successful, offers some rewards" and that "the cast is also much better than one usually finds in horror films of this type".

References

Sources

External links 

 
 

1940s science fiction horror films
1940s American films
1941 films
1941 horror films
Mad scientist films
American monster movies
American black-and-white films
Films directed by Stuart Heisler
Films about gorillas
Films about brain transplants
American science fiction horror films
Paramount Pictures films